is a Japanese television series which premiered on TV Asahi on April 15, 2011.

Cast
 Ryo Nishikido as Yuji Hongo  
 Asami Mizukawa as Sachiko Hongo
 Kokoro Kuge as Mako Hongo 
 Ryutaro Yamasaki as Masaru Hongo
 Tetsu Watanabe as Resident Association leader
 Takao Toji as the apartment complex building manager
 Mai Tachihara 
 Kojiro Kawai 
 Mayu Harada
 Junnosuke Taguchi as Katsuhiko Hotta
 Kohei Takeda as Hideki Kawashima
 Yuki Shikanuma as Yukiko Azumi 
 Shingo Kazami as Keisuke Nakao
 Fukikoshi Mitsuru as Seigo Nozaki 
 Tetta Sugimoto as Soichi Narahashi
 Shigeru Izumiya as Matsuo Kubota
 Akemi Omori as Hatsue Kubota
 Eriko Moriwaki as Yoshiko Hatakeyama 
 Ryoka Ihara as Shizuka Hatakeyama
 Yoko Oshima as Sachiko's co-worker
 Masahiro Kohama as the manager of the supermarket

Episodes

References

External links
 

Japanese drama television series
TV Asahi television dramas
2011 Japanese television series debuts
2011 Japanese television series endings